Maarten 't Hart (born 25 November 1944 in Maassluis) is a Dutch writer. Trained as a biologist in zoology and ethology at the Leiden University, he taught that subject before becoming a full-time writer in the 1980s, having made his debut as a novelist in 1971 under the name Martin Hart with Stenen voor een ransuil ("Stones for a Long-Eared Owl").

He is the author of many novels, including Het Woeden der Gehele Wereld and De kroongetuige. His books have been translated into a number of European languages, and he is especially popular in Germany.

The themes of his novels, which often have an autobiographical component, include:
 the hometown of his youth, Maassluis
 the strict form of the Protestantism with which he was brought up, and his rebellion against it
 the love of a man for a woman
 the relationship between an elderly man and a young man (e.g. a father and his son, a teacher and a student)
 guilt.
His writings are full of detailed descriptions of nature (e.g. the weather, insects, plants) and show his passionate love for classical music (especially the music of the composers Bach, Mozart and Schubert).

't Hart has also written non-fiction, including Ratten (1973), published in an English translation as Rats by Arnold Pomerans (London/New York: Allison and Busby, 1982).

't Hart is supporter of the Party for Animals, and, in 2004, agreed with the party to underline that by becoming a candidate in the European elections. However, for this he needed an official identity document, and he has no driving licence, and had neither a  passport nor another identity document (he had not been abroad for 10 years), and, for reasons of principle, did not want to get one for this purpose. He is also a prominent radio and television personality, and a regular contributor to daily newspapers.

He currently lives in Warmond, close to Leiden, with his wife. His chief pastimes are music – he plays the piano and the organ – and reading. He says he reads six books a week, in Dutch, English, German, and French. He knows very little about films and rarely watches one. He does not want to be involved in films based on his books. He was, however, "rat consultant" to Werner Herzog for the film Nosferatu the Vampyre. This turned out to be a disagreeable experience about which he wrote a story, "Ongewenste zeereis", that appeared in 2004 in Granta under the title "Rats".

Selected bibliography 
 (1971) 
 (1973) ; English translation: Rats (1982)
 (1973) 
 (1974) 
 (1978) ; English translation: Flight of Curlews (1986)
 (1979) ; English translation: Bearers of Bad Tidings (1984)
 (1980) 
 (1983) 
 (1984) 
 (1986) 
 (1987) 
 (1988) 
 (1991) 
 (1993) 
 (1996) 
 (2002) ; English translation: The Sundial (2004)
 (2004) 
 (2006) 
 (2019)

See also 
Franca Treur
Jan Siebelink

References

External links 

1944 births
Living people
20th-century Dutch writers
21st-century Dutch writers
Criticism of the Bible
Dutch animal rights activists
Dutch atheists
Dutch biologists
Dutch writers
Ethologists
Former Calvinist and Reformed Christians
Knights of the Order of the Netherlands Lion
Party for the Animals
People from Maassluis